Kader Fall (born 25 December 1986) is a Senegalese footballer who last played for Kuwaiti Premier League club Al Arabi as midfielder.

kader has won with Al Arabi SC the Kuwait super cup and crown prince cup and Kuwait federation cup and had 3 fantastic seasons with them.

References

Senegalese expatriate sportspeople in Morocco
Senegalese footballers
1986 births
Living people
Association football forwards
Maghreb de Fès players
Al-Arabi SC (Kuwait) players
Muscat Club players
Senegalese expatriate sportspeople in Oman
Al-Fahaheel FC players
Fanja SC players
Kuwait Premier League players
Oman Professional League players
Senegalese expatriate footballers
Expatriate footballers in Kuwait
Expatriate footballers in Morocco
Expatriate footballers in Oman